Granit Musa (born 6 March 1993), professionally known as Azet, is a German-Albanian rapper.

Azet released his debut studio album Fast Life in 2018, which peaked at number one in Germany, Austria and Switzerland. He continued to achieve similar success with the subsequent collaborative album Super Plus in 2019, which additionally peaked the album charts in the German-speaking Europe.

Biography

1993–2017 

Granit Musa was born in Tirana on 6 March 1993 into an Albanian family from the city of Podujevo, Kosovo. His family left Kosovo for political reasons due to the persecution of Albanians initiated with the disintegration of Yugoslavia. After relocating to Dresden, Germany, he grew up in the district of Prohlis and met his future friend and longtime collaborator Nash.

In 2016, Azet announced his debut extended play, Fast Life, which peaked at number 51 in Switzerland. In 2017, he almost released three singles, including "Gjynah", which peaked at number eight in Germany and Switzerland. His follow-up single, "Qa Bone" in collaboration with Austrian rapper RAF Camora, became his first single to be certified gold by the Bundesverband Musikindustrie, IFPI Austria and IFPI Switzerland. The same year, Azet was featured on "Nummer 1" in collaboration with rappers Zuna and Noizy, which achieved to be certified platinum in Germany and gold in Austria and Switzerland.

2018–present 

In 2018, Azet released his debut studio album, Fast Life, and experienced commercial success in German-speaking Europe debuting at number one on the Austrian, German and Swiss album charts. Afterwards, he collaborated with fellow Zuna on his follow-up top-ten singles "Skam koh", "Lelele" and "Hallo Hallo". In December 2018, Azet announced his first collaborative album, Super Plus, with the aforementioned rapper to be released in March 2019. After the release, it debuted at number one on the charts of Austria and Germany and peaked at number two in Switzerland.

Discography 

 Fast Life (2018)
 Super Plus (2019)
 Mango EP (2019)
 Fast Life 2 (2020)
 Neue Welt (2021)
 Ultra Plus (2022)
 Tirana EP 1 (2023)

Notes

References

External links 

Azet on YouTube

1993 births
Living people
Musicians from Dresden
German people of Albanian descent
German people of Kosovan descent
German rappers
Albanian emigrants to Germany
Kosovan emigrants to Germany
Musicians from Tirana
21st-century Albanian rappers